Poltso is a rural locality (a selo) in Borisoglebskoye Rural Settlement, Muromsky District, Vladimir Oblast, Russia. The population was 308 as of 2010. There are 9 streets.

Geography 
Poltso is located 46 km northeast of Murom (the district's administrative centre) by road. Borok is the nearest rural locality.

References 

Rural localities in Muromsky District